The High Wycombe Coachway is a coachway interchange close to junction 4 of the M40 motorway to the west of High Wycombe opened on 16 January 2016. Prior to its establishment,  some 150 coaches on the Oxford to London coach route passed High Wycombe each day without stopping because it would cause too much delay for other passengers were they to go via  the town centre.  The concept is based on the very successful Milton Keynes Coachway next to Junction 14 of the M1 and other coachway interchanges.

Coach services 
LGW: Gloucester Green to Gatwick Airport via Heathrow Terminal 5 & Heathrow Central bus station, operated by Oxford Bus Company
LHR: Oxford City Centre to Heathrow Central bus station via Heathrow Terminal 5, operated by Oxford Bus Company
OXF: Heathrow Central bus station to Gloucester Green, operated by Oxford Bus Company

Local bus routes
8: railway station and bus station
34: Abbey Barn Park, railway station and bus station

References

External links
M40 Coachway (Ideas in Transit)

Bus stations in England
High Wycombe
Transport infrastructure completed in 2016
2016 establishments in England